Nila Kaalam is a 2001 Indian Tamil-language television film directed by Gandhi Krishna. The film stars Roja and several child artists. The film was also released at film festivals and child artiste Master Udayaraj went on to win National Film Award for Best Child Artist. The film is based on Sujatha's novel Andru Un Arukil.

Plot 
The protagonists are three children — Nilaa (Baby Ranjini Pradeep), Amirdhalingam "Amar" (Master Dinesh) and Balasubramaniam "Pulli" (Master Udayaraj). The two boys work in a garage for the owner (Bala Singh) which is next to Nilaa's house.

Nilaa, daughter of a popular actress, Veni (Roja), who is estranged from her husband, has all the material comforts but yearns for company. Nilaa watches her mother shoot for a film with actor Ashok (Prabhu Deva). Soon, she strikes a friendship with the boys. The children `plan' a picnic and Nilaa provides the car, food and the works. Their excitement knows no bounds. But that day proves to be the last day of their carefree laughter, childish pranks... their innocence-filled childhood.

Cast 
Source

Roja as Veni
Master Dinesh as Amar (Amirdhalingam)
Master Udayaraj as Pulli (Balasubramaniam)
Baby Ranjini Pradeep as Nilaa
Nellai Sundarrajan as Pattabi
Rasheed Ummer as Raja
 Bala Singh as the garage owner
Durai Ramesh
Vikram Dharma
Manivannan
Kalairani 
S. Rangarajan and Sujatha (guest appearance)
Walter Devaram (guest appearance)
 Prabhu Deva as Ashok (guest appearance)
 Manobala (guest appearance)

Production 
An earlier title for the project was Pookutti. The film was made in 18 days on a shoestring budget of ₹45 lakh (worth ₹3.5 crore in 2021 prices).

Release 
The film had a brief theatrical run after the film was broadcast on television.

A reviewer from The Hindu cited that "Udayaraj as Pulli hogs the limelight. As the eight-year-old orphan who only dreams of being with his non- existent mother and is completely ignorant about the ways of the mean world, Udayaraj would give the best actor a run for his money".

References 

2000s Tamil-language films
2001 films
Indian children's drama films
Indian television films